American Woodmark is a kitchen and bath cabinet manufacturer, headquartered in Winchester, Virginia. The company operates 9 manufacturing facilities, in Arizona, Georgia, Indiana, Kentucky, Maryland, Tennessee, Virginia, and West Virginia, and 9 builder service centers across the country.

History 
In 1951, Alvin A. Goldhush, a Long Island dentist, made dental cabinets and created the company Formed Laminates, Inc. in Lindenhurst, N.Y. Goldhush eventually gave up dentistry and devoted his time to the company, now named Raygold Corp. Raygold Corp acquired a wood processing plant in Moorefield, W.V. in 1957.

Boise Cascade acquired Raygold and moved the company head office from Long Island to Winchester, Virginia. In the late 1970s, Boise Cascade changed its business focus from wood products to paper products. In 1979, four executives of the cabinetry division (Bill Brandt, Al Graber, Jeff Holcomb, and Don Mathias) initiated a leveraged buyout. They formed American Woodmark Corporation in 1980 and floated on Nasdaq in 1986 for $15 per share.

Today the company operates 18 manufacturing plants throughout the US and Mexico and nine service centers who provide direct service to the new home construction market.

Products 
American Woodmark produces and distributes high quality faceframe kitchen and bath cabinetry through a variety of channels, including remodel, new construction and specialty dealers.  Cabinets are offered in a wide range of colors and materials.  They are vertically integrated and source the majority of their hardwood raw materials from the Appalachian region.  All cabinets are assembled in the US in one of four assembly plants throughout the country.

References

External links 
 American Woodmark Corporation
 American Woodmark Cabinetry
 Shenandoah Cabinetry
 Timberlake Cabinetry
 Waypoint Living Spaces

Building materials companies of the United States
Companies based in Virginia
Companies listed on the Nasdaq
Furniture companies of the United States
Winchester, Virginia